Montauban is a commune in and capital of the Tarn-et-Garonne department in the Occitanie region of southern France.

Montauban may also refer to:
 Arrondissement of Montauban containing the town
 Roman Catholic Diocese of Montauban centred on the town
 Montauban-Ville-Bourbon station, the railway station serving the town
 US Montauban, the town's main rugby club

Other places
 Montauban-sur-l'Ouvèze, a commune in the Drôme department in southeastern France
 Montauban-de-Luchon, a commune near the Spanish border
 Montauban-de-Picardie, a village in the Somme department in northeastern France
 Montauban-de-Bretagne, a commune in Brittany in northwestern France
 Montauban Lake, in Saint-Alban, Quebec, Canada

People
 Montauband (Etienne de Montauban), a 17th-century pirate

See also
 Montalbán (disambiguation)